Joseph Meriwether Terrell (June 6, 1861November 17, 1912) was a United States Senator and the 57th Governor of Georgia.

Background
Born in Greenville, he was the son of Sarah Rebecca (née Anthony) and Dr. Joel Edgar Green Terrell. He attended the common schools, studied law, and was admitted to the bar in 1882, commencing practice in Greenville.

On October 19, 1886, he married Jessie Lee Spivey. They had no children.

Terrell was a self-declared "uncompromising friend of common school education."

Terrell was of English ancestry and of partial Norman descent.

Career
Terrell was a member of the Georgia House of Representatives from 1884 to 1887, and a member of the Georgia Senate in 1890. He served as state attorney general from 1892 to 1902, and Governor of Georgia from 1902 to 1907, marred by the Atlanta race riot of 1906. He resumed the practice of law in Atlanta, and was appointed to the U.S. Senate as a Democrat to fill the vacancy caused by the death of Alexander S. Clay, serving from November 17, 1910 to July 14, 1911, when he resigned. Terrell suffered a stroke in February 1911.

Death and legacy
He again resumed the practice of law in Atlanta although in poor health and died there from Bright's Disease on November 17, 1912. He was survived by his wife.

Interment was in the City Cemetery, Greenville.

The Liberty ship Joseph M. Terrell was named for him. Terrell Hall, on the campus of Georgia College and State University in Milledgeville, was also named for him.

References

External links

 

1861 births
1912 deaths
Democratic Party governors of Georgia (U.S. state)
Democratic Party members of the Georgia House of Representatives
Democratic Party Georgia (U.S. state) state senators
Georgia (U.S. state) lawyers
Georgia (U.S. state) Attorneys General
Democratic Party United States senators from Georgia (U.S. state)
People from Meriwether County, Georgia
American people of Norman descent
19th-century American politicians
20th-century American politicians
19th-century American lawyers
People born in the Confederate States